The 1989 World Tour was the fourth concert tour by American singer-songwriter Taylor Swift, in support of her fifth studio album, 1989 (2014). Swift announced the tour's first dates in North America, Europe, Japan, and Oceania in November and December 2014. She announced additional dates for Singapore and China in June 2015, and a final announcement of the third show in Melbourne was made the following month.

The tour took seven months to plan and three months to rehearse. As with her previous tours, Swift was involved in the 1989 World Tour's planning and stage design. She aimed to create an intimate experience for concertgoers, which she found challenging for shows held in stadiums. The set list included songs predominantly taken from 1989, with additional songs from Swift's older albums transformed into a more synth-oriented production, to accompany the album's songs. For different shows, she incorporated a random song from her back catalog. The tour began on May 5, 2015, in Tokyo, Japan, and concluded on December 12, 2015, in Melbourne, Australia, spanning 85 shows. For many of the shows, Swift invited special guests onstage with her, including musicians, actors/actresses, athletes, and models whom the media called her "squad".

The world's highest-grossing tour of 2015, the 1989 World Tour sold over 2.278 million tickets and grossed over $250.7 million. It was acclaimed by critics, receiving praise for Swift's stage presence and connection with the audience. Swift's appearances with an array of special guests, meanwhile, attracted commentary regarding her new image as a pop star—having previously been known as a country singer-songwriter—and her sense of authenticity that she had maintained. On December 20, 2015, Swift released a concert film entitled The 1989 World Tour Live in partnership with Apple Music. It was filmed at the tour's November 28, 2015 show at ANZ Stadium in Sydney, Australia, and features additional scenes of special guests from other shows throughout North America and Europe.

Background and development 

Taylor Swift released her fifth studio album 1989 on October 27, 2014. The synth-pop album was Swift's first album marketed as pop music, departing from her image as a country artist. It was a commercial success, selling over one million copies within its first week of release in the United States. On November 3, 2014, via her Twitter account, Swift announced the first details of her world tour in support of 1989. Australian singer Vance Joy was announced to be an opening act, and tickets would go sale on for North American fans on November 14.

In a November 2014 interview with Time magazine, Swift said that the set list would primarily consist of songs from 1989. For songs taken from her older catalog, she wanted them to fit in with the synth-heavy production of 1989 while keeping the "live feel" of live performances. Swift, as always, was heavily involved in the tour's planning and production design. She acknowledged the challenge of playing in stadiums, expressing her goal for "those people in the very top row [to] feel like they got an intimate, personal experience". In an interview with KIIS-FM in December 2014, she revealed that she knew what the stage would look like, as well as knowing that "all the fans seem to be saying that they really don't want any song [from 1989] left off the setlist".

Swift first announced the North American and European dates in November 2014. The tour was set to kick off in Bossier City, Louisiana on May 20, 2015, and conclude in Tampa, Florida on October 31, 2015. Additional shows were held across the U.S., Canada, England, Scotland, Germany, and the Netherlands. A month after announcing the first dates, Swift added further shows, visiting Japan, and Australia. The first date of the tour would be in Japan in May 2015, and the shows in Australia would take place in November–December 2015. In June 2015, Swift announced further shows in Asia, visiting China and Singapore in November 2015. The following month, Swift announced a third show in Melbourne, Australia, which would also wrap up the 1989 World Tour on December 12, 2015. Opening acts for the tour included Vance Joy, Shawn Mendes, Haim, and James Bay.

The tour took seven months to plan before three months of music rehearsals, four weeks of stage rehearsals and 10 days of two-a-days dress rehearsals. Swift traveled for the tour with 26 semi-trailer trucks and 11 buses carrying 146 people from city to city. Additionally, about 125–150 people were hired in each city to help with the load in and stage setup. The entire load in and stage setup process took between six and eight hours for arenas, with stadiums requiring an additional day. Swift chose two designs for the trucks' vinyl wrap; 13 carry one design and 13 have the other. Concertgoers were given light-up bracelets that could be programmed to change color throughout each show, a practice that was also later implemented in Swift's Reputation Stadium Tour (2018) and the Eras Tour (2023).

Concert synopsis 

The shows on the 1989 World Tour featured a nearly identical set list spanning the majority of the 1989 studio album, with the exception of "Wonderland" (a 1989 deluxe bonus track), and different shows had different guest stars intertwined between Swift's performances. The concert began with black-and-white projections of street scenes, which subsequently served as the backdrop to the performance of "Welcome to New York". Swift then emerged from beneath the stage to sing the song, and subsequently "New Romantics", surrounded by a dozen of male dancers. For the followup performance of "Blank Space", Swift sang the song before erupting into a call-and-response climax where Swift struck a golf club against a black lacquer cane, whilst also shouting the name of the city where each concert is held. Swift proceeded with an industrial rock-oriented version of "I Knew You Were Trouble", which she performed as the shirtless male dancers delivered a sensual choreography.

After the performance of "I Wish You Would", Swift appeared in a glowing pink polka-dot dress to perform "How You Get the Girl", accompanied by a choreography inspired by the 1952 musical Singin' in the Rain that was performed by the male dancers twirling neon umbrellas. The show continued with "I Know Places", during which Swift wore thigh-high black boots and garters. The song's intense lyrics and production were accompanied by a performance of Swift being chased by the masked dancers through multiple mobile doors as she sang "They are the hunters / We are the foxes." After the song ended, Swift performed "All You Had to Do Was Stay", which was followed by either "You Are in Love" or a customized number that she performed differently at several shows. "All You Had to Do Was Stay" was excluded from the set list for several shows. Swift introduced "Clean" by sharing lessons she had learnt in personal life with her audiences. After "Clean", Swift performed a synth-oriented version of "Love Story" while standing on an elevated platform that whisked around the stadium.

Swift proceeded with "Style", during which she performed while strutting down the runway-styled stage in a sparkling dress, and "This Love". For the performance of "Bad Blood", Swift dressed in a top-to-toe black leather suit. She then performed a rock version of "We Are Never Ever Getting Back Together" on an electric guitar, in an intense atmosphere with her hair messed up. Afterwards, Swift emerged from beneath the stage again, and performed a mashup of "Enchanted" and "Wildest Dreams" on a grand piano. She followed with "Out of the Woods", which she performed in a sparkling bodysuit as giant paper planes flew overhead. The show concluded with "Shake It Off", during which Swift and the dancers danced on a spinning platform above the crowd as fireworks and confetti dashed across the venue.

Adjustments and special guests

For different shows, Swift replaced "You Are in Love" with "Wonderland", another 1989 deluxe album track, or songs from her earlier albums. The songs included "Should've Said No" (from 2006's Taylor Swift); "You Belong with Me", "Fifteen" and "Fearless" (from 2008's Fearless); "Mean", "Sparks Fly" and "Mine" (from 2010's Speak Now); "Holy Ground", "All Too Well", and "Red" (from 2012's Red). During the second show in Santa Clara, California on August 15, 2015, Swift dedicated "Never Grow Up" (from Speak Now) to her godson, the second child of her friend, actress Jaime King.

A feature of the 1989 World Tour that attracted attention was its array of unannounced special guests that Swift invited onstage with her. Swift explained during an interview with Apple Music's Beats 1 Radio that since her fans could have expected what the show would look like through social media posts prior to attending, she wanted to incorporate an element of surprise: "They know the set list, they know the costumes, they've looked it up. That presented me with an interesting issue. I love the element of surprise… so going into this tour, having people pop on stage that you didn't expect to see." Though Swift had invited musicians onstage with her during previous tours, she this time invited singers, models, athletes, and actors/actresses across "every type of field". A notable example included the show at London's Hyde Park in July 2015, during which models Martha Hunt, Kendall Jenner, Karlie Kloss, Gigi Hadid, and Cara Delevingne joined Swift onstage, which was noted by the media as Swift's "squad"—her representation of her newly established feminist identity. While some of the guests were scheduled beforehand, others were improvised; Swift asked singer John Legend to join her onstage only 40 minutes prior to showtime, after spotting him in the audience.

As the tour went on, special guests ranged from Hollywood actress Julia Roberts to counterculture figure Joan Baez. Nick Levine from the BBC observed that while these special guests were well appreciated by Swift's fans, their appearances gave the impression to others that Swift did so to prove her star power of her new image as a pop star—having abandoned her previous image as a country artist. In doing so, Swift's sense of authenticity began to slip despite her global stardom. Kristy Fairclough, a professor in popular culture and film, commented: "Her shifting aesthetic and allegiances appear confusing in an overall narrative that presents Taylor Swift as the centre of the cultural universe." Fairclough asserted that while Swift had presented herself as an underdog and outsider from her contemporaries, which had garnered her a devoted fan base, she began to appear as "a profoundly unsympathetic underdog" for being a "globally famous, attractive, thin, white, very wealthy woman". When the tour ended, Swift acknowledged that "people might need a break from [her]". New York magazine listed Swift's "squad" as one of the defining moments of music in the 2010s decade.

Critical reception 

The 1989 World Tour was met with universal acclaim; praise centered on the elaborate stage production and Swift's stage presence. Vice Eric Sundermann appreciated Swift's ability to connect with her audiences, saying: "She has built a career on making music that’s suited for the fabric of our lives, so it makes sense that her show is engineered to be the best night of your life." Jon Caramanica, writing for The New York Times, acknowledged Swift's comfortable performance onstage. Rolling Stone critic Rob Sheffield appreciated the reworked versions of Swift's older songs, and felt that she was pushing for an even more spectacular show than her much-praised previous Red Tour (2013–14), writing: "Taking the easy way would have been 100 percent good enough. It just wasn’t what she wanted to do. Instead, she wanted to push a little harder and make a gloriously epic pop mess like this." In a similarly enthusiastic review, Kevin Coffrey from the Omaha World-Herald observed how the stage production complemented the songs: "Her show is on a level unlike anything I've ever seen."

Paige Allen from The Sun Chronicle was positive towards Swift's performance, but felt that she alone could have carried the show without opening acts and special guests. Hunter Hauk of The Dallas Morning News also deemed the opening acts "forgettable", but was impressed by Swift's natural performance onstage. In a review of the Glasgow show, David Pollock from The Independent lauded Swift's energetic performance and described the show as a "resonantly feminist show which emphasises a fun, heartfelt message over polemic". Reviewing the tour's Sydney show, Bernard Zuel from the Sydney Morning Herald gave it a four-and-a-half-stars score. Zuel lauded the show as "one of the most spectacular stadium shows" he had ever seen, and praised Swift's stage presence for creating a lively and euphoric energy. Reviewing the same show, Elle Hunt of The Guardian gave it a perfect five-over-five-stars score, asserting that the show was a reminder of Swift's emotional engagement through her songs as her greatest asset that "has won her enormous global fandom". In 2017, Rolling Stone included the 1989 World Tour in their list of the "50 Greatest Concerts of the Last 50 Years".

Commercial reception

Ticket sales 

Pre-sales for European shows of the 1989 World Tour started on November 4, and public on-sale started on November 7 (tickets for London were sold later on November 10). The first round of pre-sales on selected North American shows started on November 7 and general sales for the public in North America started from November 14, 2014; Australia started from December 12, 2014; Japan started from the following day; Singapore and Shanghai started from June 30, 2015. Swift was the sixth-most-searched artist on Ticketmaster in 2014.

In St. Louis, Swift was originally scheduled to perform on October 13 and 14, 2015, but one of the St. Louis shows was dropped and the other was rescheduled to September 28, 2015, with tickets going on sale on January 30, 2015. However, tickets for the St. Louis show sold out within minutes, resulting in a second date being added there on September 29 at the same venue. Due to massive demand, Swift added more dates to the European leg, one for Cologne and one for Dublin. Swift added one more Dublin show after six minutes when the first show sold out, and tickets for both concerts sold out within 55 minutes. In Australia, tickets for the first show on December 11, 2015, in Melbourne, at AAMI Park were sold out in less than an hour. Soon afterwards, Swift announced extra dates for Melbourne and Adelaide. Due to popular demand, in July 2015, Swift added a third Melbourne show after the first two shows were sold out. Swift became the first female artist to play three shows at AAMI Park. In January 2015, Forbes reported that the 1989 World Tour was one of the most expensive concert tours of 2015 on the secondary market.

Boxscore 

The tour topped the Billboard Hot Tours chart with Swift's first five shows from the North American run (May 20 – June 6, 2015, excluding Baton Rouge), which generated a total of $16.8 million from 149,708 ticket sales. It topped the Billboard Hot Tours chart for the second week, earning $15.2 million, with a total of 129,962 tickets sold from three shows in Charlotte and Philadelphia. By August 1, 2015, the 1989 World Tour had grossed $86.2 million, at 20 performances in North America, with 771,460 tickets sold at seven arenas and nine stadiums. On September 9, Billboard reported that the tour had grossed over $130 million, with 1.1 million tickets sold. The 1989 World Tour surpassed the Red Tour as Swift's highest-grossing by October 2015, when Billboard reported that the tour had grossed over $173 million. The tour also returned to number one on the Hot Tours chart, becoming Swift's sixth time atop the chart in 2015, thanks to ticket sales totaling $13.6 million from the shows in Toronto, St. Louis and Des Moines.

On Billboard list of the "Top 25 Boxscores" published in December 2015, Swift scored seven entries with the 1989 World Tour shows, the highest number of entries among all touring acts. After concluding in Melbourne, the tour grossed over $250 million and became the world's highest-grossing tour in 2015, as reported by Pollstar. It was also the highest-grossing North American tour of 2015. Specially, the 1989 World Tour grossed nearly $200 million in North America alone, breaking the previous all-time high of $162 million set by the Rolling Stones in 2005. Two shows in Tokyo ranked at number nine on Pollstar list of "2015 Year-End Top 100 International Boxoffice". Other shows appearing on the list were the shows in Melbourne, Sydney, Shanghai, and Brisbane. The 1989 World Tour also scored 24 shows on another list of Pollstar – "2015 Year-End Top 200 Concert Grossed [in North America]" – with the highest position (number five) being the two shows in East Rutherford; and the lowest position (number 160) being two shows in Denver. Overall, the tour broke a string of attendance and grossing records, including the record for most sold-out shows by an artist in Staples Center history (16 shows across Swift's career), commemorated in a banner presented by Kobe Bryant.

Concert film

The tour was supported by a concert film, titled The 1989 World Tour – Live. It was released on December 20, 2015, exclusively via Apple Music. Directed by Jonas Åkerlund, the film was filmed at the  Sydney, Australia, concert from the 1989 World Tour, held at ANZ Stadium on November 28, 2015, where Swift performed in front of over 76,000 people. Prior to the show, concertgoers were informed that it would be filmed for a commercial purpose.

On December 13, 2015, Swift announced she had partnered with Apple Music to release The 1989 World Tour - Live on the 20th of the same month. It contains over two hours of concert, interview, and never-before seen backstage and rehearsal footage with some of the musical and surprise guests from previous shows. Scenes from The 1989 World Tour - Live were compiled for the music video for "New Romantics", the seventh and final single from the album.

Awards and nominations

Set list 
This set list is representative of the show on May 5, 2015, in Tokyo. It is not representative of all concerts for the duration of the tour.

 "Welcome To New York"
 "New Romantics"
 "Blank Space"
 "I Knew You Were Trouble"
 "I Wish You Would"
 "How You Get the Girl"
 "I Know Places"
 "All You Had to Do Was Stay"
 "You Are in Love"
 "Clean"
 "Love Story"
 "Style"
 "This Love"
 "Bad Blood"
 "We Are Never Ever Getting Back Together"
 "Enchanted" / "Wildest Dreams"
 "Out of the Woods"
Encore
 "Shake It Off"

Surprise songs

The following songs were performed by Swift in place of "You Are In Love":

 "Wonderland" (from 1989): During the shows in Las Vegas, Bossier City, Pittsburgh, and the second performance in Cologne
 "Holy Ground" (from Red): During the second show in Dublin
 "You Belong with Me" (from Fearless): During the second shows in East Rutherford, Washington, Denver, Columbus, Los Angeles, Adelaide, and Shanghai; the first shows in Toronto, Nashville, Kansas City, St. Louis, Foxborough, and Singapore; and the shows in Des Moines and Salt Lake City
 "Fifteen" (from Fearless) During the first shows in Chicago, Omaha, Denver, Saint Paul, and Edmonton; the second shows in Melbourne, Toronto, St. Louis, Foxborough, Nashville, Kansas City, and Glendale; the third show in Los Angeles; and the shows in Indianapolis, Lexington, Arlington, Fargo, Miami, Greensboro, Atlanta, and Tampa
 "Mean" (from Speak Now): During the second shows in Chicago and Saint Paul, the fifth show in Los Angeles, and the shows in Seattle and Houston
 "Sparks Fly" (from Speak Now): During the show in Vancouver
 "Fearless" (from Fearless): During the second show in Edmonton, the first show in Omaha, and the show in San Diego
 "Should've Said No" (from Taylor Swift): During the first show in Santa Clara
 "Never Grow Up" (from Speak Now): During the second show in Santa Clara
 "Ronan" (non-album song): During the first show in Glendale
 "All Too Well" (from Red): During the first show in Los Angeles
 "Red" (from Red): During the first show in Columbus
 "Mine" (from Speak Now): During the show in Brisbane
 "Long Live" (from Speak Now): During the third show in Melbourne

Special guests

Below is the complete list of special guests who appeared onstage or performed with Swift on the 1989 World Tour.
 May 15, 2015 – Las Vegas: "Tenerife Sea" with Ed Sheeran
 May 30, 2015 – Detroit: "Radioactive" with Dan Reynolds of Imagine Dragons; Martha Hunt & Gigi Hadid.
 June 6, 2015 – Pittsburgh: "Pontoon" with Little Big Town.
 June 12, 2015 – Philadelphia: "Cool Kids" with Echosmith; Cara Delevingne & Mariska Hargitay.
 June 13, 2015 – Philadelphia: "Fight Song" with Rachel Platten; Mariska Hargitay.
 June 27, 2015 – London: Gigi Hadid, Kendall Jenner, Serena Williams, Martha Hunt, Karlie Kloss and Cara Delevingne.
 July 10, 2015 – East Rutherford: "Can't Feel My Face" with The Weeknd; Heidi Klum and United States women's national soccer team; Lily Aldridge, Lena Dunham, Gigi Hadid and Hailee Steinfeld.
 July 11, 2015 – East Rutherford: "Jealous" with Nick Jonas; Gigi Hadid, Martha Hunt, Lily Aldridge, Candice Swanepoel, Behati Prinsloo, Karlie Kloss, and Uzo Aduba.
 July 13, 2015 – Washington, D.C.: "Royals" with Lorde.
 July 14, 2015 – Washington, D.C.: "Want to Want Me" with Jason Derulo.
 July 18, 2015 – Chicago: "Honey, I'm Good." with Andy Grammer; Serayah.
 July 19, 2015 – Chicago: "Take Your Time" with Sam Hunt; Andreja Pejić & Lily Donaldson.
 July 24, 2015 – Foxborough: "Shut Up and Dance" with Walk the Moon.
 July 25, 2015 – Foxborough: "Classic" with MKTO.
 August 1, 2015 – Vancouver: "Am I Wrong" with Nico & Vinz.
 August 8, 2015 – Seattle: "Trap Queen" with Fetty Wap; Ciara and Russell Wilson.
 August 14, 2015 – Santa Clara: "Worth It" with Fifth Harmony.
 August 15, 2015 – Santa Clara: "Black Magic" with Little Mix; Joan Baez and Julia Roberts.
 August 21, 2015 – Los Angeles: "Counting Stars" with Ryan Tedder of OneRepublic; Kobe Bryant presenting Swift with a banner hung on the Staples Center rafters in honor of Swift's 16 sold out shows, the most of any recording artist at the arena.
 August 22, 2015 – Los Angeles: "White Horse" with Uzo Aduba; Chris Rock, Matt LeBlanc and Sean O'Pry; "Doubt" and "Family Affair" with Mary J. Blige.
 August 24, 2015 – Los Angeles: "Goodbye Earl" with Natalie Maines of the Dixie Chicks; Ellen DeGeneres; "You Oughta Know" with Alanis Morissette.
 August 25, 2015 – Los Angeles: "Dreams" with Beck and St. Vincent; "All of Me" with John Legend.
 August 26, 2015 – Los Angeles: "Good for You" with Selena Gomez; "Smelly Cat" with Lisa Kudrow; "Mirrors" with Justin Timberlake.
 August 29, 2015 – San Diego: "Cheerleader" with OMI; "Complicated" with Avril Lavigne.
 September 9, 2015 – Houston: "See You Again" with Wiz Khalifa.
 September 16, 2015 – Indianapolis: "If I Die Young" with The Band Perry.
 September 18, 2015 – Columbus: "Cool Kids" with Sydney Sierota of Echosmith.
 September 21, 2015 – Kansas City: "Every Mile a Memory" with Dierks Bentley.
 September 25, 2015 – Nashville: "Love Me Like You Mean It" with Kelsea Ballerini; "I Don't Want to Miss a Thing" with Steven Tyler of Aerosmith; "When You Say Nothing at All" with Alison Krauss.
 September 26, 2015 – Nashville: "Bleeding Love" with Leona Lewis; "(I Can't Get No) Satisfaction" with Mick Jagger of The Rolling Stones.
 September 29, 2015 – St. Louis: "The Fix" with Nelly, and "Hot in Herre" with Nelly and Haim. To celebrate Haim's last night on the tour, Swift invited them to join her onstage as back-up dancers for Nelly.
 October 2, 2015 – Toronto: "John Cougar, John Deere, John 3:16" and "Somebody Like You" with Keith Urban.
 October 3, 2015 – Toronto: "Boom Clap" with Charli XCX.
 October 17, 2015 – Arlington: "Love Me like You Do" with Ellie Goulding.
 October 21, 2015 – Greensboro: "Little Red Wagon" with Miranda Lambert.
 October 24, 2015 – Atlanta: "Talking Body" with Tove Lo.
 October 27, 2015 – Miami: Dwyane Wade presenting Swift a "13" numbered jersey in honor of Swift's lucky number and his 13th season with the Miami Heat; "Give Me Everything" with Pitbull; "Livin' la Vida Loca" with Ricky Martin.
 October 31, 2015 – Tampa: "Here" with Alessia Cara; "Let It Go" with Idina Menzel. During "Style", before "Let It Go" was performed, Swift wore an Olaf costume while Menzel wore her in-voice character Elsa, both from Frozen, in honor of Halloween.

Shows

Notes

Personnel 
Adapted from The 1989 World Tour Book

Show

 Erica Worden – tour manager
 Tree Paine – publicist
 Arthur Kemish – production manager
 Chris Rowe – audio
 Dewey Shepard – stage manager
 Donna Edmondson – hair and make-up
 Jemma Muradian – hair stylist
 Lorrie Turk – make-up artist
 Scott Coraci – video engineer
 Tyce Diorio – choreographer
 Tricia Miranda – assistant choreographer

Band

 Taylor Swift – lead vocals, guitar, electric guitar, piano, keyboard
 David Cook – musical director, keyboards
 Matt Billingslea – drums, electronic percussion
 Amos Heller – bass, synth bass, vocals
 Eliotte Henderson – background vocalist
 Kamilah Marshall – background vocalist
 Michael Meadows – guitars, keyboards, vocals
 Melanie Nyema – background vocalist
 Paul Sidoti – guitar, vocals
 Clare Turton-Derrico – background vocalist
 Dane Laboyrie – trumpet
 Brendan Champion – trombone
 James Mackay – tenor saxophone
 Jimmy Garden – baritone saxophone

Dancers
 Christian Henderson
 Jacob Kodish
 Christian Owens
 Maho Udo
 Austin Spacy
 Mark Villaver
 Nolan Padilla
 Remi Bakkar
 Richard Cutler
 Giuseppe Giofrè
 Robert Green

Wardrobe
 Floyd Williamd
 Joseph Cassell
 Jessica Jones
 Shannon Summers
 Tyler Green
 Todd Cantrell
 Pamela Lewis

Executive producers
 Taylor Swift
 Andrea Swift
 Robert Allen
 Austin Fish

Production designers
 Taylor Swift
 Baz Halpin
 Chris Nyfield

See also 
 List of highest-grossing concert tours

References

External links 

 

2015 concert tours
Taylor Swift concert tours
Concert tours of North America
Concert tours of the United States
Concert tours of Canada
Concert tours of Europe
Concert tours of the United Kingdom
Concert tours of Germany
Concert tours of Ireland
Concert tours of Oceania
Concert tours of Australia
Concert tours of Asia
Concert tours of Japan
Films directed by Jonas Åkerlund
Concert tours of Singapore
Concert tours of China
Concert tours of the Netherlands